Oceanitis is a genus of marine fungi in the class Halosphaeriaceae. It has four species. The genus was circumscribed by mycologist Jan Kohlmeyer in 1977, with Oceanitis scuticella assigned as the type species.

The genus name of Oceanitis refers to the Greek mythology, the Oceanids or Oceanides (the daughters of Oceanus).

Species
Oceanitis cincinnatula 
Oceanitis scuticella 
Oceanitis unicaudata 
Oceanitis viscidula

References

Sordariomycetes
Sordariomycetes genera
Taxa described in 1977